The Women's team pursuit was held on 19 October 2012. 6 nations participated.

Medalists

Results
Fastest 2 teams raced for gold and 3rd and 4th teams raced for bronze.

Qualifying
It was held at 13:00.

Finals
The finals were held at 19:30.

References

Women's team pursuit
European Track Championships – Women's team pursuit